Michael Salgado  (born Miguel Salgado in 1971 in Stanton, Texas, United States) is a Norteño/Tejano music singer/accordionist.

Biography
He was born in Texas, although his family roots are in Barrancos, Chihuahua, Mexico.

Michael Salgado gained prominence in the mid-1990s by looking back to the 'norteño' sound influenced by Ramon Ayala, and by subsequently introducing the style to the younger generation. He positioned his backing musicians, brother Ernie and Uncle Jamie, to play guitar and drums respectively, with the bass player being his compadre, Joe Tanguma — at the age of only 19. He began climbing the Latin American music charts in 1995 after releasing his single "Cruz de Madera". Salgado's 1996 album "En Concierto" introduced his most successful single, "Sin Ella", which reached the top 20 of the Latin American music charts. His album "Mi Primer Amor" was released in 1997.

Discography
Albums in order from newest to oldest:

Vino Especial
 A Grito Abireto
 Undido en la Tristeza
 Llego Borracho el Borracho
 El Tuerto
 Vino Especial
 Sufriendo Penas
 Yaquecita
 Puro Cuento
 Que te vaya Bonito
 Luis Pulido
 Que tristeza yo Traigo
 Corazon Seco
 El Viboron
 Esta Soledad
 Me Despido

Volver Volver
 No Quiero Seguir Sufriendo
 Que Bonito
 Ahora Que Tengo Dinero
 La Yegua Ajena
 Volver Volver
 Hay Unos Ojos
 Tu Tienes La Culpa
 Me Toco Perder
 Cuenta Aparte
 Dile
 Mal Pasado De Amor
 Hasta El Fin
 Quedo Triste Y Abandonado
 Leyenda Macabra
 Tristes Corazones
 Me Cambio Por El Dinero
 Aunque Estes Tan Lejos

El Zurdo De Oro
 Te Quiero Te Extraño
 Dueña De Mi Corazon
 Prison De Botellas
 El Panadero
 Me Agarro Contigo
 Sirveme Otra Cantinero
 Rosalva De Leon
 Perdoname
 Morena De Mi Vida
 Pobre Desdichado
 Tu Retrato
 Entre Botellas De Vino
 Por Tu Culpa
 Corrido
 Me Ha Robado El Corazon
 Harto

Entre Copas
 La Cruz De Vidrio
 La Condena
 Esta Noche Me Encuentro Borracho
 El Indio
 Maldita Suerte
 El Bilongo
 Mi Cielo Gris
 Mi Ultimo Trago
 Llore Llore
 Voy A Navegar
 Lleno De Recuerdos
 Prefiero Morir
 Copa Tras Copa
 La Ultima Botella
 La Novedad

Tu Musica...Sin Fronteras
 Tu Recuerdo
 Mi Ultima Parranda
 Dime Si El
 No Me Llores
 Maldiciendo Tu Destino
 Que Te Bendiga Dios
 Enséñame Olvidarte
 Dicen
 Porque No Vienes Ya
 Por Ella
 No Te Puedo Olvidar
 Linda Muñeca
 Lágrimas De Mi Barrio

Sangre de Rey
 Sangre de Rey
 Agárrame Compadre
 Quiero Ver
 Porque Eres Mujer
 Pormesas Falsas
 Cuando Te Fuiste
 Comelona
 Mi Tenampa
 Pase Internacional
 Que Pensaran De Mi
 Para Que Presumes
 Tu puta madre

Mejores Tiempos
 Sufriendo El Castigo
 Ya No Voy Aguantar
 No Puedo Olvidarla
 No Me Amenaces
 Macario Leyva
 Ojitos
 Compréndeme
 Desde Que Tu Te Fuiste
 Su Nombre En La Cruz
 No Puedo Mas
 Se Me Olvidó Otra Vez

Otra Vez A La Cantina
 Cruz Grabada
 Otra Vez A La Cantina
 A Mover El Bote
 Como Haces Falta
 Nomas El Pilar Quedo
 El Chonte
 Amor Prohibido
 Que Traigan Botellas
 El Hijo De Sue
 Tu Mereces Ser Feliz
 Paloma Querida
 Luz Elia La De Chihuahua

Puro Pueblo
 Ya Volaré Volaré
 Te Fuiste
 Yo Quiero Saber
 Mi Chatita
 Dos Cruzes
 Un Cancionero Lloró
 Amor
 Corazón
 Corazón Ya No Llores
 Será Que Tú
 Disfrasando
 Cantinero

Homenaje A Cornelio Reyna
 Golondrina a Cornelio Reyna
 Callejón Sin Salida
 Ya No Llores
 Por El Amor A Mi Madre
 Te Vas Angel Mio
 El Embrujado
 Me Caiste Del Cielo
 Mi Tesoro
 Sufro Por Ti
 Ni Por Mil Puñados De Oro
 El Disgusto
 Que Bonita Chaparrita

De Buenas Raices
 La Media Vuelta
 Junto A Mí
 Palomita Blanca
 Nuestro Gran Amor
 Me Estas Partiendo El Alma
 Que No Recuerdas
 Llorar Llorar
 El Besito
 Un Poquitito De Amor
 Lamento Hispano

En Concierto...
 Si Quisieras
 Cruz De Madera
 Sin Ella
 Amigo
 El Dia En Que Te Fuiste
 Recordando A Los Relampagos
 Mi Lindo Padre
 Muñeco
 Si Tu Te Vas
 El Gallo Desplumado

Cruz De Madera
 El Día Que Te Fuiste
 Cruz De Madera
 Muñeco
 Esta Noche
 Si Tú Te Vas
 No Me Hagas Menos
 Feliz Con Otro
 Usted No Me Conoce
 El Gallo Desplumado
 Mi Lindo Padre

References

External links
 Michael Salgado's official website
 Biography at Yahoo Music

American accordionists
Latin Grammy Award winners
Living people
Tejano musicians
1971 births
21st-century accordionists
21st-century Mexican singers
21st-century American male singers
21st-century American singers